Migueleño Chiquitano (self-denomination: ózura , literally 'our speech') is a variety of the Chiquitano language of the Macro-Jê family, which is remembered by several dozen people of the Chiquitano ethnicity in San Miguel de Velasco (Santa Cruz), Bolivia, as well as in neighboring villages.

Migueleño is closely related to other varieties of the Chiquitano language, such as Bésɨro and Eastern Chiquitano. It is also the only variety of Chiquitano in which distinct first person singular prefixes have been documented for the male and female genderlects.

Phonology

Consonants
The consonant inventory of Migueleño Chiquitano is shown below (the orthographic representation is given in italics; the characters in slashes stand for the IPA values of each consonant).

Vowels
The vowel inventory of Migueleño Chiquitano is shown below (the orthographic representation is given in italics; the characters in slashes stand for the IPA values of each vowel).

Genderlects
In Migueleño Chiquitano, male speech is distinct from female speech in exhibiting extra morphological complexity. In particular, the male genderlect distinguishes between three grammatical genders (masculine, non-human animate, and feminine/inanimate), whereas the female genderlect has no grammatical gender distinctions at all (all nouns behave like the feminine/inanimate nouns in the male genderlect).

In addition, the first person singular prefixes are distinct in the male genderlect (underlying form |ij-|) and in the female genderlect (underlying form |ix-|).

Female and male speech further differ in using different suffixes (female -ki, male -che) when deriving content interrogative/relative words.

There are also differences in the choice of the demonstratives.

Chiquitano homilies
In San Miguel de Velasco, Catholic homilies are traditionally recited in an early form of Migueleño Chiquitano on certain religious occasions. This practice can be traced back to the Jesuit reductions of the 18th century, and the texts of the homilies have been transmitted (both orally and in the written form) across generations. The homilies have been extensively studied by Severin Parzinger, who has published a compilation thereof.

References

Languages of Bolivia
Indigenous languages of South America (Central)
Language isolates of South America
Jesuit Missions of Chiquitos